is a prominent Japanese businessman notable for his positions at the head of Nippon Steel and Sumitomo Metal Corporation, and as Chairman of the Japan-Australia Business Cooperation Committee, for which the Australian government awarded him their highest civilian award for a foreigner, Honorary Companion of the Order of Australia.

Mimura is 19th Chairman of Japan Chamber of Commerce of Industry(JCCI) since 2013, which is the largest small and medium business association with 1,250,000 corporate members in Japan.

Biography
Akio Mimura was born 2 November 1940 in Gunma Prefecture and was educated at the University of Tokyo (B.A. 1963) and Harvard Business School (M.B.A. 1972). In April 1963 he joined Fuji Iron & Steel Co Ltd which became part of Nippon Steel in 1970, which in turn became part of Nippon Steel & Sumitomo Metal in 2012. He rose through various senior management positions in the 1980s, becoming a board member in 1993 and Managing Director in 1997.

Board and committee positions
Sources:

Honours and awards
 September 2012: Honorary Companion of the Order of Australia
 October 2012: Doctor of Science, honoris causa, Australian National University

References

External links

Honorary Companions of the Order of Australia
Living people
Japanese businesspeople
1940 births
Harvard Business School alumni
University of Tokyo alumni